Melvius is a genus of vidalamiin amiid fish from the Late Cretaceous. The type species, Melvius thomasi, was described by Bryant in 1987. A second species Melvius chauliodous, was named and described by Hall and Wolburg in 1989, and it is now considered to be one of the index taxa of the Kirtlandian land-vertebrate age.

References 

Amiiformes
Prehistoric ray-finned fish genera
Late Cretaceous fish of North America
Cretaceous bony fish
Hell Creek fauna
Fossil taxa described in 1987